Night Killer is a 1990 Italian slasher film directed by Claudio Fragasso. On its release in Italy, it was promoted as being part of The Texas Chainsaw Massacre. The film is not part of the series and bears little content from the previously released films.

Cast
 Tara Buckman as Melanie Beck
 Peter Hooten as Axel
 Richard Foster as Sherman Floyd
 Mel Davis as Detective Clark
 Lee Lively as Dr. Willow
 Tova Sardot as Clarissa

Production
Night Killer was shot in the United States. After Fragsso finished the film, the producers hired Bruno Mattei to shoot additional scenes of graphic gore before the film's release in Italy.

Style
Paul Zachary of Bloody Disgusting stated that the film combined elements of giallo and more straightforward slasher films. Zachary described it as a "Franken-film" combining several bit and pieces of other related work.

Release
Night Killer was first released in Italy in August 1990. The film was released the same year that Leatherface: The Texas Chainsaw Massacre III was distributed in Italy and was promoted unofficially as a sequel in The Texas Chainsaw Massacre franchise despite the plot not bearing any relation to the rest of the series. The films Italian title, Non aprite quella porta 3 riffs on the Italian title for the Texas Chainsaw Massacre series. The film was released on DVD and blu ray by Severin Films on June 25, 2019.

Reception
From retrospective reviews, Jason Shawhan of Nashville Scene compared it to Bad Dreams and The Invasion stating it did not reach those levels of "ripoff and quilt cinema" comparing it to Night Porter and A Nightmare on Elm Street, concluding that it was a "trashy film that wants to provoke every possible emotion, and the fact that it manages to find genuine empathy amid the chest wounds and obscene phone calls and sexualized capers makes for an experience that just doesn't happen very often in movies anymore".

References

Sources

External links
 
 Night Killer at Variety Distribution

Italian horror films
1990 horror films
1990 films
Unofficial sequel films
Films directed by Claudio Fragasso
Films scored by Carlo Maria Cordio